Shaye Shkarovsky (1891–1945) was a Yiddish author who lived in the Soviet Union. He was a member of the Vidervuks (New Growth) group in and around Kiev.

Shkarovsky was born in Bila Tserkva. His father, Isaac, was a cheder teacher and social activist. Shaye regularly donated to Zionist groups. In 1942 he was evacuated to Ufa during World War II, but was nonetheless killed during the war.

Journalism
Shkarovsky began working in journalism as an 18-year-old, contributing to the Kiev Russian Press and in 1910 in the Kiev Weekly journal, where he wrote 24 articles about Jewish literature. In 1915 he began working for a newspaper in Odessa, and in 1921 he edited a weekly Communist paper, transforming it to a daily paper. He reported from the border with Romania and covered the pogroms that swept across Ukraine, continuing to be an activism journalist well into the 1920s and 1930s.

Books
Shkarovsky published several Yiddish books:
Der Arshter May (Odessa, 1921)
Ragas (Kiev, 1922)
Kayor (Moscow, 1928)
Kolvirt (Kiev, 1931)
In Shniṭ Fun Tsayṭ (Kiev, 1932)Meron (Kharkov, 1934)Odes (Kiev, 1938)Nakhes fun Kinder '' (Kiev, 1938)

References

1891 births
1945 deaths
People from Bila Tserkva
People from Kiev Governorate
Ukrainian Jews
Ukrainian Zionists
Yiddish-language writers
Soviet civilians killed in World War II